United Nations Security Council Resolution 1651, adopted unanimously on 21 December 2005, after recalling previous resolutions on the situation in Sudan, particularly resolutions 1556 (2004) and 1591 (2005), the Council extended the mandate of an expert panel monitoring sanctions against and violations of human rights in the Darfur region until 29 March 2006. It was the last Security Council resolution adopted in 2005.

Observations
The Security Council stressed its commitment to peace in Sudan, the implementation of the Comprehensive Peace Agreement and the end of the violations in the Darfur region. It emphasised the need for respecting elements of the United Nations Charter, including those relating to the Convention on the Privileges and Immunities.

Acts
The resolution, enacted under Chapter VII of the United Nations Charter, extended the expert panel established in Resolution 1591 (2005) until 29 March 2006 and requested it to report on the implementation of the sanctions and observations on human rights.

See also
 African Union Mission in Sudan
 United Nations–African Union Mission in Darfur
 International response to the War in Darfur
 List of United Nations Security Council Resolutions 1601 to 1700 (2005–2006)
 South Sudan
 War in Darfur

References

External links
 
Text of the Resolution at undocs.org

 1651
2005 in Sudan
 1651
December 2005 events